Konkors Kanzunetta Indipendenza ("Independence Song Contest") is Maltese song competition held on a day near September 21 (Malta's independence day). All songs are performed in the Maltese language and is one of the most anticipated events on the Maltese musical calendar. The event first took place back in 1983 in a span of four years until 1987 before returning just 10 years later in 1997 going on to take place each and every year since then. Several local stars like to submit their entries into such a prestigious musical event due to the fact that the songs are written in Maltese. In recent years there were a number of winners who went on to be successful both locally and abroad. Below you could find the list of the past winners.

List of winners
 1983 - Jo Naudi with the song Nibqgħu Ngħożżuh Malti
 1984 - Tanya Camilleri with the song Lejn l-Għaqda u s-Sliem
 1985 - Adelina Attard with the song Għajta Kotrana
 1986 - Brown Rice with the song Il-Ħaddiem tas-Sena
 1987 - Godwin Lucas with the song Viżjoni
 1997 - Tarcisio Barbara with the song In-Nar Ħa
 1998 - Miriam Christine with the song Nistaqsi
 1999 - Claudette Pace with the song Ejjew Nippruvaw
 2000 - Mark Tonna with the song Waħdek Ma Tkun Qatt
 2001 - Ira Losco with the song  Fejn Staħbejtli
 2002 - Lawrence Gray with the song L-Għażla f'Idejna
 2003 - Roger Tirazona & Nadine Axisa with the song Inħarsu 'l Quddiem
 2004 - Natasha & Charlene with song the L-Arka tal-Libertà
 2005 - Eleanor Cassar with song the Ix-Xemx mill-Ġdid
 2006 - Claudia Faniello with the song Ma Nafx
 2007 - Ivan & Kaya with the song Dan Hu L-Mument
 2008 - Is-Sitta with the song Nistgħu Nirnexxu
 2009 - Anabelle with the song 1964
 2010 - Amber Bondin with the song Trid Tapprezza
 2011 - Mike Spiteri with the song B'Rieda tal-Azzar
 2012 - Deborah C with the song Jekk Nuzaw Moħħna
 2013 - Fabrizio Faniello with the song Aħfirli Jekk Trid
 2014 - Michela Galea with the song Mixja Li Bdiet
 2015 - Analise Mifsud with the song Kuraġġ
 2016 - Dario Bezzina with the song Se Naslu Żgur
 2017 - Nicole Falzon with the song Bħal Fjura
 2018 - Sarah Bonnici with the song Il-Pinna
 2019 - Rachel Lowell with the song Li Stajt Nagħżel Jien
 2020 - Ruth Portelli with the song Kuruni
 2021 - Cherylis with the song Nifs

Runners-Up (2nd place)
 1999 - Roberta Cassar with the song Qalbi Taf Tħoss
 2000 - Fabrizio Faniello with the song Inhobbok…Tgħid lil Ħadd
 2001 - Eleanor Cassar & Glen Vella with the song M'Hawnx Bħalek
 2002 - Lawrence Gray with the song Ħalluni Nkanta
 2003 - Mike Spiteri with the song Grazzi Mill-Qalb
 2004 - Mark Spiteri Lucas & Donna Marie with the song Il-Ballata tal-Mara Li Ħabbet
 2005 - Janvil with the song Int u Jien
 2006 - Kaya with the song Se Nkun Viċin
 2007 - Klinsman with the song KC1FM
 2008 - Dorothy Bezzina with the song Qalb iċ-Ċpar
 2009 - Kaya with the song Lilek Biss
 2010 - Gloriana Arpa Belli with the song Fil-Mużika
 2011 - Albertine u l-Qamha with the song Skont id-Daqqa ż-Żifna
 2012 - Marilena with the song Bl-Ikbar Serjetà
 2013 - Neville Refalo with the song Hemm Miegħek Jien
 2014 - Marilena with the song Ġabuna Indipendenti
 2015 - Dorcas Debono with the song Ma Ninsa Qatt
 2016 - Kaya with the song B'Ħarsitna 'l Fuq
 2017 - Chanelle Galea with the song Ċans tad-Deheb
 2018 - Victoria Sciberras with the song Siluwett
 2019 - Danica Muscat with the song Sfumaw
 2020 - Mardy Farrugia with the song Fjuri
 2021 - Mark Portelli with the song Forsi Ismi Ssejjaħ

3rd place
 1999 - Mark Tonna with the song Il-Bikja tal-Lejl
 2000 - Maronia Attard with the song Mistoqsija
 2001 - Ira Losco with the song Hawn Jien Jekk Tridni
 2002 - Miriam Christine with the song Nessini
 2003 - Roberta Cassar with the song Semma Leħnek
 2004 - Romina Mamo with the song Saħħartni
 2005 - Nadine Axisa with the song Ma Rridx
 2006 - Cliff & Annabelle with the song Ġenna Tal-Art
 2007 - Eleanor Cassar with the song Fil-Fond tal-Qalb
 2008 - Claire Caruana with the song X'Inhu l-Mewġ?
 2009 - Fabrizio Faniello with the song Futur
 2010 - Romina Mamo with the song L-Eroj
 2011 - Janice Mangion with the song Eternità
 2012 - Domenique with the song Tama u Kuraġġ
 2013 - Nicole Brincat with the song Ħallini Ngħidlek
 2014 - Cherylis with the song Ħolma Ta' Nazzjon
 2015 - Dario Bezzina with the song Dment li l-Malti Ħaj
 2016 - Karen DeBattista with the song Ħarstek
 2017 - Francesca Borg with the song Ftit Ħin
 2018 - Sebastian Calleja with the song Dak li Taf
 2019 - Amber Grace with the song Ngħix
 2020 - Graziella Vella with the song Darba f'Mitt Qamar
 2021 - Kylie Meilak with the song Mill-Petali Mneżżgħa

Talent Ġdid Winners
 2008 - Gabriella Massa with the song Għada mas-Sebħ
 2009 - Dian Bland with the song Ġenerazzjoni
 2010 - Cherylis Camilleri with the song Nemmen Fik
 2011 - Angelica Portelli with the song Ejjew Nieqfu
 2012 - Sarah Bonnici with the song Bil-Bnadar f'Idejna
 2013 - Kimberly & Lyann with the song Kliem Maġija
 2014 - Kurt Cassar with the song Inservi
 2015 - Mikaela Bajada with the song Għandi Ħolma
 2016 - Shaun Zaffarese with the song Vittorja
 2017 - Nicole Falzon with the song Bħal Fjura
 2018 - Maria Spiteri with the song Manann

Public Opinion Winners
 1999 - Roberta Cassar with the song Qalbi Taf Tħoss
 2000 - Maronia Attard with the song Mistoqsija
 2002 - Shirley Galea with the song Qatt Daqs Illum
 2003 - Maronia Attard with the song Jekk Taf
 2004 - Anna Azzopardi & Ivan Borg with the song Il-Ħarsa T'Għajnejk
 2005 - Maria Mallia with the song Sejħiet
 2006 - Tristan B with the song L-Għanja Taż-Żmien Ġdid
 2007 - Klinsmann Coleiro with the song KC1FM
 2008 - Deborah C with the song Pandora
 2009 - Christian Azzopardi with the song Madre Perla
 2010 - Roseann Cordina with the song Jum Wieħed 
 2011 - Deborah C with the song Fjamma
 2012 - Deborah C with the song Jekk Nużaw Moħħna
 2013 - Domenique with the song B'Ħarsitna 'l Fuq
 2014 - Phylissienne Brincat with the song Tħobbni Kif Jien
 2015 - Nicole Borg with the song Fis-Seba' Sema
 2016 - Aidan Cassar with the song Speċjali
 2017 - Dorcas Debono with the song Xwejħa
 2018 - Martina Fenech with the song Qalbi
 2019 - Kevin Cortis with the song Kif Ma Tismax
 2020 - Krista Spiteri Lucas with the song Jgħidulek
 2021 - Martina Fenech with the song Xtaqt Sejjaħtlek Pa

KKI Junior Winners
 2014 - 1st place - Kayley Cuschieri with the song Għannaqni
 2014 - 2nd place - Jurgen Xerri with the song Ħajjitna f'Idejna
 2014 - 3rd place - Destiny Chukunyere with the song Festa t'Ilwien
 2014 - Televoting - Naomi Busuttil with the song Damma
 2015 - 1st place - Paolo Micallef with the song Maġija B'Teknoloġija
 2015 - 2nd place - Nicole Falzon with the song Ngħix Ħolma
 2015 - 3rd place - Rutger Scicluna Galea with the song Inħobbkom It-Tnejn
 2015 - Televoting - Wynona Bartolo with the song Quddiem Għajnej
Reference:
An eight-page supplement of the Maltese newspaper In-Nazzjon of 18 September 2006 published on the occasion of the 2006 edition of the Konkors Kanzunetta Indipendenza compiled by Raymond Miceli with information about this year's edition and with a special article about all the singers who participated in previous editions.

Music festivals in Malta
Autumn events in Malta